The Palaeosetidae or miniature ghost moths are a family of insects in the order Lepidoptera  contained within the superfamily Hepialoidea.

Taxonomy and systematics
The Palaeosetidae are a primitive family of Hepialoidea with four currently recognised genera and seven species.

Distribution
One genus occurs in Colombia (Osrhoes) and the other three genera have an Old World distribution from Assam to Australia.

References

External links
Tree of Life
Ogygioses
Wikispecies

Hepialoidea
Moth families